1 Chronicles 20 is the twentieth chapter of the Books of Chronicles in the Hebrew Bible or the First Book of Chronicles in the Old Testament of the Christian Bible. The book is compiled from older sources by an unknown person or group, designated by modern scholars as "the Chronicler", and had the final shape established in late fifth or fourth century BCE. This chapter records the account of David's wars against the neighboring nations, especially the Ammonites and the Philistines. The whole chapter belongs to the section focusing on the kingship of David (1 Chronicles 9:35 to 29:30).

Text
This chapter was originally written in the Hebrew language. It is divided into 8 verses.

Textual witnesses
Some early manuscripts containing the text of this chapter in Hebrew are of the Masoretic Text tradition, which includes the Aleppo Codex (10th century), and Codex Leningradensis (1008).

Extant manuscripts of a Koine Greek translation known as the Septuagint, made in the last few centuries BCE, include Codex Vaticanus (B; B; 4th century), Codex Alexandrinus (A; A; 5th century) and Codex Marchalianus (Q; Q; 6th century).

Old Testament references
: 
:.

The capture of Rabbah (20:1–3)

Verse 2
And David took the crown of their king from off his head, and found it to weigh a talent of gold, and there were precious stones in it; and it was set upon David's head: and he brought also exceeding much spoil out of the city.
"The crown of their king": from Hebrew:  --; rendered "the crown of Milkom" in NRSV, following Septuagint and Vulgate, referring to "Milkom", 'the national deity of the Ammonites' (7, 33).
"Talent": a weight measurement about 
"Spoil": or "plunder"

Battles against the Philistines (20:4–8)
The Chronicles also harmonizes the confusing claims in the books of Samuel (and ) into a clearer statement in verse 5.

Verse 5
King James Version
And there was war again with the Philistines; and Elhanan the son of Jair slew Lahmi the brother of Goliath the Gittite, whose spear staff was like a weaver's beam.

New English Translation
There was another battle with the Philistines in which Elhanan son of Jair the Bethlehemite killed the brother of Goliath the Gittite, whose spear had a shaft as big as the crossbeam of a weaver’s loom.

The Hebrew text comparison with the corresponding verse  demonstrates that the Chronicles (composed after the Babylonian exile) provides clarification to the older text written before the exile, as can be seen here (Hebrew text is read from right to left):

2 Samuel 21:19:   ויך אלחנן בן־יערי ארגים בית הלחמי את גלית
transliteration: wa·yaḵ ’el·ḥā·nān ben-ya‘·rê ’ō·rə·ḡîm bêṯ ha·laḥ·mî, ’êṯ 
English: "and killed Elhanan ben Jaare-Oregim bet-ha-Lahmi, (brother) of Goliath"

1 Chronicles 20:5: ויך אלחנן בן־יעיר            את־לחמי  אחי גלית
transliteration: wa·yaḵ ’el·ḥā·nān ben-yā·‘îr                   ’eṯ-laḥ·mî,   ’ă·ḥî 
English: "and killed Elhanan ben Jair                           Lahmi, brother of Goliath"

The relation of Lahmi to Goliath in the older text (Samuel) is only given using the word "’êṯ" which can be rendered as "together with; related to", whereas in the newer version (Chronicles), it is given using the word "’ă·ḥî" meaning "brother". Therefore it is clear in the Chronicles that David killed Goliath (as recorded in 1 Samuel 17), then Elhanan killed the brother of Goliath.

It is also noted that the word "’ōregîm" (meaning "weaver") is written only once in this verse, but it is found twice in 2 Samuel, the first of which is attached to the proper name "Jaare" to be "Jaare-oregim", which may create confusion with the second use of the word to describe the weapon of the Philistine.

Verse 8
These were born to the giant in Gath, and they fell by the hand of David and by the hand of his servants.
"The giant": from Hebrew:  hā-, "Rapha" (NET Bible), whereas in 2 Samuel 21:22 it is written as  hā-, "Raphah." This elevates the significance of the mentioned battles, although it does not appear as such in the English translation.

See also

Related Bible parts: 1 Samuel 17, 2 Samuel 10, 2 Samuel 12, 2 Samuel 21, 1 Chronicles 19

Notes

References

Sources

External links
 Jewish translations:
 Divrei Hayamim I - I Chronicles - Chapter 20 (Judaica Press) translation [with Rashi's commentary] at Chabad.org
 Christian translations:
 Online Bible at GospelHall.org (ESV, KJV, Darby, American Standard Version, Bible in Basic English)
 First Book of Chronicles Chapter 20. Bible Gateway

20